Empusa longicollis is a species of praying mantis in the family Epusidae.

See also
List of mantis genera and species

References

longicollis
Insects described in 1950